News Light is the former flagship news program of Light TV - God's Channel of Blessings under Zoe Broadcasting Network Inc. in the Philippines.

With the tagline “Ang mga balitang dapat niyong malaman sa loob ng 30 minuto” (All the news that you need to know within 30 minutes), News Light aimed to deliver top stories and headlines, and gave viewers an alternative view of news.

News Light aired on Light TV Channel 33 during weekdays at 6:00 PM (PST), with five-minutes news updates at 11:30 AM and 2:00 PM.

News Light is replaced with News Light Sa Umaga, which airs on weekdays at 8:30 am.

Personalities

Former Anchors
 Phoebe Dela Cruz-Cabral

Former Fill-in-Anchors
 Sarah Lagsac
 Christian Mitra
 Ace Cruz

Former Anchors/Reporters
 Sheryl Hermosa
 Jenna Serrano
 Cel de Guzman
 Joash Bermejo
 Rhema Penaflor
 Issa Esteban
 Ivy Catucod
 Raissa Puno-Diaz
 Ron Dulay
 Preciouc Pacho
 Mark Makalalad
 Amos Manalastas
 Famila Nicor
 Karen Garucha
 Ar Vargas
 Jeffrey Batlangao
 Cecil Legaspi
 Jaymie Dela Rosa
 Xandra Cabigquez
 Jamie Pancho
 Glenn Batrina
 Annie Bico
 Lusset Cunanan
 Ace Cruz
 Christian Mitra

News Light Sa Umaga

News Light Sa Umaga is the flagship news program of Light TV – God’s Channel of Blessings (Channel 33) under ZOE Broadcasting Network Inc. in the Philippines.

It began airing in 2019 on weekdays at 8:30 am under Light TV Radio, the news and public affairs unit of Light TV, with other programs namely Daylight Devotion, Bangon na Pilipinas, and Straight from the Word.

News Light Sa Umaga presents local news, global news (Balitang Abroad), sports news (Sports Light), and other human-interest stories (Good News, Good Vibes) in the light of the gospel.

With the tagline “Maghahatid ng 30-minutong balitaan ng mga dapat niyong malaman”, it aims to deliver complete, balanced, fair, and accurate news within 30 minutes.

The news program is anchored by Annie Bico-Cristobal, who also stands as the Head and Executive Producer of Light TV Radio, and Ace Cruz. Former anchors include Daniel Castro, Ar Vargas, Christian Mitra, Sarah Lagsac-Arsenio, Liam Eustaquio, and Aida Gonzales. Fill-in-anchors include Rose Ann Sibag.

It is simulcast nationwide via Light TV Channel 33, DZJV 1458 Radyo CALABARZON, and DWZB 91.1 FM in Palawan.

Anchors
 Annie Bico-Cristobal
 Ace Cruz

Fill-in-Anchors
 Rose Ann Sibag

Reporters
 Mico Agustin
 Giselle Crazo
 Christopher Tirambulo
 Billy Torres
 Jomar Villanueva

Former Anchors
 Daniel Castro
 Ar Vargas
 Christian Mitra
 Sarah Lagsac-Arsenio
 Liam Eustaquio
 Aida Gonzales

See also
ZOE Broadcasting Network

References

Philippine television news shows
2011 Philippine television series debuts
2019 Philippine television series endings
Filipino-language television shows
Flagship evening news shows
Philippine radio programs
2019 radio programme debuts
2020 radio programme endings
Light TV original programming